Orta may refer to:

Places
Orta, Møre og Romsdal, an island in Aukra, Norway
Orta, Çankırı, a district of Çankırı Province, Turkey
Orta, a town near Rome which, in medieval contexts, may also be called Orte
Lake Orta, in north Italy
Orta di Atella, comune in the Province of Caserta in the Italian region Campania
Orta Nova, town and comune from Foggia, in the region of Apulia, in southern Italy 
Orta San Giulio, a town on Lake Orta
Orta, Tavas, populates place in Denizli Province, Turkey

People
Garcia de Orta (1501 – 1568) Portuguese physician, herbalist and naturalist
Jorge Orta (born 1950), Mexican Major League Baseball player
Lucy Orta, a British contemporary  artist
Ramsey Orta, a friend of Eric Garner's who recorded on his cell phone the police murdering Garner

Other uses
Orta (Janissary), a military rank of Janissaries
 Orta, a fictional Italian village in the film Captain Carey, U.S.A.
Office of Research and Technology Applications (ORTA), an organizational structure established in federal laboratories though the Stevenson-Wydler Technology Innovation Act of 1980 (P.L. 96-480)-Wydler Technology Innovation Act of 1980 (P.L. 96-480)
 Panzer Dragoon Orta, the describer and heroine of the fourth game in the Panzer Dragoon series